David Chytraeus or Chyträus (26 February 1530 – 25 June 1600) was a German Lutheran theologian, reformer and historian. He was a disciple of Melancthon.

He was born at Ingelfingen. His real surname was Kochhafe, which in Classical Greek is χύτρα, from where he derived the Latinized pseudonym "Chyträus".

Chytraeus was professor of the University of Rostock and one of the co-authors of the Formula of Concord. He is known for his work as the author of a Protestant catechism. His original Latin text was published in 1554, then reprinted in 1599. Now it has been translated for the first time in German. It has been published, together with editorial notes and commentary by Michael.

He is the author of a treatise on music, De Musica, and a theological treatise, De Sacrificiis.

Chytraeus died in Rostock, aged 70.

Notes

References
 Joachim Burmeister, Poétique musicale. Suivi de David Chytraeus – De la Musique, translation, introduction, notes and lexicon by Agathe Sueur and Pascal Dubreuil, Rhuthmos, 2017.
The Protestant Theological and Ecclesiastical Encyclopedia by John Henry Augustus Bomberger, 1860, p. 714.
 Chytraeus, David, article in Schaff-Herzog Encyclopedia of Religious Knowledge

 

1530 births
1600 deaths
People from Ingelfingen
16th-century Latin-language writers
16th-century German historians
German Lutheran theologians
Academic staff of the University of Rostock
16th-century German Protestant theologians
German male non-fiction writers
16th-century German male writers

16th-century Lutheran theologians
17th-century Lutheran theologians